The batih is a thick stick that is rhythmically tapped on the floor in some Ukrainian folkloric groups. Pieces of metal or bottle-caps can be attached to the stick, which rattle when the stick strikes the ground. This adds to the percussive effect of the instrument.

Batih is also a last name derived from Batik.

Related instruments 
Lagerphone

See also
Ukrainian folk music

Sources

Humeniuk, A. - Ukrainski narodni muzychni instrumenty - Kyiv: Naukova dumka, 1967
Mizynec, V. - Ukrainian Folk Instruments - Melbourne: Bayda books, 1984
Cherkaskyi, L. - Ukrainski narodni muzychni instrumenty // Tekhnika, Kyiv, Ukraine, 2003 - 262 pages. 

Ukrainian musical instruments
European percussion instruments
Unpitched percussion instruments
Struck idiophones
Hand percussion